Jin Xuan (died 209), courtesy name Yuanji, was an official and minor warlord who lived during the late Eastern Han dynasty of China.

Life
Jin Xuan was a descendant of Jin Midi and was from Jingzhao Commandery (京兆郡; around present-day Xi'an, Shaanxi). He held several appointments in Han central government, including Gentleman of the Yellow Gate, Consultant and General of the Household, before serving as the Administrator of Wuling Commandery (武陵郡; around present-day Changde, Hunan).

After the Battle of Red Cliffs in 208, the warlord Liu Bei set off to attack the four commanderies in southern Jing Province, namely Changsha, Guiyang, Lingling and Wuling. The Sanfu Juelu zhu mentioned that Jin Xuan was killed in battle and Wuling Commandery became part of Liu Bei's territories, but the Sanguozhi recorded that the Administrators of the four commanderies surrendered to Liu Bei.

Family
Jin Xuan had a son, Jin Yi, whose courtesy name was Deyi. In 218, Jin Yi, along with Ji Ben, Geng Ji, Wei Huang and others, started a rebellion in Xu (許; present-day Xuchang, Henan) against the warlord Cao Cao and injured Wang Bi, an official serving under Cao Cao. The rebellion was eventually suppressed by Wang Bi and a general Yan Kuang. All the conspirators, including Jin Yi, were rounded up and executed.

In Romance of the Three Kingdoms
Jin Xuan appears in chapter 53 of the 14th-century historical novel Romance of the Three Kingdoms as the Administrator of Wuling Commandery. At that time, Liu Bei sent his general Zhang Fei to attack Wuling Commandery. Jin Xuan wanted to resist the invaders but his Assistant Officer, Gong Zhi, advised him to surrender. The following day, Jin Xuan fought with Zhang Fei outside the city but was defeated and forced to retreat. However, he was betrayed by Gong Zhi, who killed him with an arrow shot to the face. Gong Zhi later surrendered Wuling to Zhang Fei.

See also
 Lists of people of the Three Kingdoms

References

 Chen, Shou (3rd century). Records of the Three Kingdoms (Sanguozhi).
 Luo, Guanzhong (14th century). Romance of the Three Kingdoms (Sanguo Yanyi).
 Pei, Songzhi (5th century). Annotations to Records of the Three Kingdoms (Sanguozhi zhu).

2nd-century births
209 deaths
Liu Biao and associates
Han dynasty warlords
Han dynasty politicians from Shaanxi
Political office-holders in Gansu
Political office-holders in Hunan
Politicians from Xi'an
Han dynasty people killed in battle